Trond Bråthen (28 May 1977 – 13 May 2012), also known by the stage names Trondr Nefas and Alastor Nefas, or simply as Nefas, was a Norwegian singer-songwriter, guitarist and bassist. Despite being primarily known for his work as the vocalist and lead guitarist of black metal group Urgehal, which he founded in 1992 alongside Thomas "Enzifer" Søberg, he had numerous other projects as well, such as Beastcraft (in which he performed as "Alastor Nefas"), In Lingua Mortua, Endezzma (formerly known as Dim Nagel) and Angst Skvadron. In all of those side projects he collaborated with fellow musician and former Ásmegin member Lars Fredrik Frøislie.

On 13 May 2012 (nearly two weeks before his 35th birthday), Bråthen was found dead at his home. According to his Urgehal bandmates, he most probably died of natural causes in his sleep. On the following day they released a statement via their record label, Season of Mist:

Prior to his death Bråthen was working on a documentary about the Norwegian black metal scene, entitled A Black Metal Year in Norway. Originally slated to a 2012 release, his death prevented it from being finished and released. (A very rough cut of the film is available at YouTube though.) Around the same time Urgehal began work on their seventh studio album, Aeons in Sodom, which remained unfinished until 2016 – it was eventually finished with the help of numerous guest musicians and released on 12 February.

He is survived by his brother, Thomas Bråthen, and by fiancée Octavia.

Discography

With Kvist

 1994: Demo

With Urgehal
 For a more comprehensive list, see 
 1997: Arma Christi
 1998: Massive Terrestrial Strike
 2001: Atomkinder
 2003: Through Thick Fog Till Death
 2006: Goatcraft Torment
 2009: Ikonoklast
 2016: Aeons in Sodom (posthumous)

With Beastcraft
 2005: Into the Burning Pit of Hell
 2007: Baptised in Blood and Goatsemen

With In Lingua Mortua
 2007: Bellowing Sea – Racked by Tempest
 2010: Salon des Refusés

With Angst Skvadron
 2008: Flukt
 2010: Sweet Poison

With Endezzma
 2012: Erotik Nekrosis

References

External links
 

1977 births
2012 deaths
Black metal singers
Norwegian black metal musicians
Norwegian rock bass guitarists
Norwegian male bass guitarists
Norwegian rock guitarists
Norwegian rock singers
Norwegian male singers
Norwegian documentary filmmakers
Norwegian singer-songwriters
Musicians from Buskerud